Border Patrol a/k/a U. S. Border Patrol is a 39-episode syndicated half-hour adventure/drama  television series which aired in the United States during 1959, with Richard Webb cast as Don Jagger, the fictitious deputy chief of the Border Patrol. Guest actors in supporting roles include Ben Johnson, Lon Chaney, Jr., Don Gordon, and Herbert Rudley

Deputy Chief Jagger worked in various locations along the Canadian and Mexican borders, as well as by the United States coastlines, in search of illegal aliens, drug dealers, gun runners, and other law breakers. Stories were based on actual events recorded in United States Department of Justice files.

Border Patrol was sponsored by the American Oil Company / Amoco, and was seen in 60 markets. Series star Richard Webb made personal appearances at Amoco gas stations to help promote the television program.

Episodes

References

1959 American television series debuts
1959 American television series endings
1950s American drama television series
Black-and-white American television shows
First-run syndicated television programs in the United States
United States Border Patrol
Television series by CBS Studios
Television series about border control